Isaak August Dorner (20 June 1809 – 8 July 1884) was a German Lutheran church leader. He was a meditating theologian in nineteenth-century Germany who served as a professor of theology at the University of Berlin and had an international influence.

Life
He was born at Neuhausen ob Eck in Württemberg, where his father was pastor in the Lutheran Church. He was educated at Maulbronn and the University of Tübingen. After assisting his father for two years, he travelled in England and the Netherlands to complete his studies and acquaint himself with different types of Protestantism. He returned to Tübingen in 1834, and in 1837 was appointed professor extraordinarius of theology. As a student at the university, one of his teachers had been Christian Friedrich Schmid, author of the well-known Biblische Theologie des Neuen Testamentes and one of the most vigorous opponents of FC Baur. At Schmid's suggestion, and with his encouragement, Dorner set to work on a history of the development of the doctrine of the person of Christ, Entwicklungsgeschichte der Lehre von der Person Christi. He published the first part of it in 1835, the year in which David Strauss, his colleague, published his Life of Jesus; completed it in 1839, and afterwards considerably enlarged it for a second edition (1845–1856). It was an indirect reply to Strauss, which showed, "profound learning, objectivity of judgment, and fine appreciation of the moving ideas of history" (Otto Pfleiderer).

The author at once became highly regarded as a theologian and historian and in 1839 was invited to Kiel as professor ordinarius. It was there that he produced Das Princip unserer Kirche nach dem innern Verhältniss seiner zwei Seiten betrachtet (1841). In 1843 he moved as professor of theology to Königsberg. From there he was called to Bonn in 1847, and to Göttingen in 1853. Finally in 1862 he settled as a professor at Berlin, where he was a member of the supreme consistorial council of the Evangelical State Church in Prussia. A few years later (1867) he published his valuable Geschichte der protestantischen Theologie (English translation, History of Protestant Theology, 2 volumes; 1871), in which he "developed and elaborated," as Pfleiderer says, "his own convictions by his diligent and loving study of the history of the Church’s thought and belief."

The theological positions to which he ultimately attained are best seen in his Christliche Glaubenslehre, published shortly before his death (1879–1881). It is "a work extremely rich in thought and matter. It takes the reader through a mass of historical material by the examination and discussion of ancient and modern teachers, and so leads up to the author's own view, which is mostly one intermediate between the opposite extremes, and appears as a more or less successful synthesis of antagonistic theses" (Pfleiderer). The companion work, System der christlichen Sittenlehre, was published by his son August Dorner in 1886. He also contributed articles to Herzog-Hauck's Realencyklopädie, and was the founder and for many years one of the editors of the Jahrbücher fur deutsche Theologie.

He died at Wiesbaden on 8 July 1884. One of the most noteworthy of the "mediating" theologians, he has been ranked with Friedrich Schleiermacher, August Neander, Karl Nitzsch, Julius Müller and Richard Rothe.

His son, August Dorner, also became a prominent theologian.

References 

 Herzog-Hauck:
 Realencyklopädie
 Allgemeine deutsche Biographie (1904)
 Otto Pfleiderer, The Development of Theology in Germany since Kant (1890)
 Frédéric Auguste Lichtenberger, History of German Theology in the Nineteenth century (1889)
 Karl Schwarz, Zur Geschichte der neuesten Theologie (1869)

1809 births
1884 deaths
Academic staff of the University of Königsberg
Academic staff of the University of Göttingen
Academic staff of the University of Bonn
Academic staff of the University of Kiel
German Lutheran theologians
19th-century German Protestant theologians
People from the Kingdom of Württemberg
19th-century German male writers
German male non-fiction writers
19th-century Lutherans